Jason Chao Teng Hei (born December 12, 1986) was born in Macau. Chao is a social activist and LGBT rights campaigner. He was President of the New Macau Association and Director of the satirical newspaper Macau Concealer, one of the few online pro-democracy media in the city. He co-founded activist organisation Macau Conscience and the Rainbow of Macau.

Political stance
Jason Chao is one of the few democracy and human rights activists originally from Macau.  Chao believes that Macau is idealess and lacks core values.  Chao believes "Macau is an utterly unconvincing example of 'one country two systems', which entails Chinese promises of a 'high degree of autonomy', an independent judiciary and the rule of law".  He urges the international community to firmly stand with Hong Kong in the fight against dictatorship.

Human rights reports

In June 2020, in collaboration with the New Macau Association, Chao submitted a comprehensive civil soceity report to the United Nations Human Rights Committee on human rights issues in Macau.  The report covered freedom of expression, judicial procedure, privacy rights, government surveillance and the realisation of universal suffrage.  The issues raised in the report were adopted by the United Nations Human Rights Committee in its review of Macau's ratification of the International Covenant on Civil and Political Rights.

Social and political actions

2010
Elected as the president of the New Macau Association.

2011
 In June, Chao campaigned against a high-rise building proposal that would hugely impact the landscape of the Small Taipa Hill, by holding a referendum.
 In December, Chao revealed that government misled the public to respond in favour of putting more regulations on the journalists and news media at the consultation on revising the Publishing Law and Audio-visual Law.

2012
 During the consulting period for political reform at Macau, Chao fought for universal suffrage in the election of Legislative Assembly and Chief Executive, by conducting survey, holding a referendum and going on a hunger strike. However, he failed to accomplish it under pro-establishment organizations’ overwhelming propaganda. 
 Chao exposed that the free Wi-Fi service provided by the MSAR government would decrypt users’ protected data and enforce censorship.
 Chao co-founded the activist organization Macau Conscience in July with several netizens including Bill Chou, an associate professor at the University of Macau.
 In November, Chao co-authored with Bill Chou the second annual NGO Human Rights Report on Macau for 2012.

2013
 In January, Chao conducted the “Initial Survey on LGBT individuals in Macau”, which is the first-ever survey on the LGBT community in Macau, for the Macau LGBT Rights Concern Group.
 Chao revealed the architecture of the new campus of the University of Macau was in fact a copycat of the architecture of Nanjing Audit University, which had been constructed a few years earlier.
 Chao and associate professor Bill Chou had a video conference with the Human Rights Committee of the United Nations, in which they revealed the human right violations in Macau that were never mentioned in the report submitted by the MSAR government. 
 By invitation of the European Union, Chao visited the EU committee in Brussels and the European Council in Strasbourg in May. He is the first Macau citizen from NGOs to be invited by the EU. During his visit, Chao met with several EU officials and leaders of NGOs headquartered in Brussels.

2014

Chao was arrested for organising 2014 Macanese Chief Executive referendum.

2019

Jason Chao and Man Tou appealed to the Court of Final Appeal against a ban imposed by the public security police on a proposed rally against the police brutality in 2019–20 Hong Kong protests.  The Court denied the appeal.

LGBT rights movement

First involvement 
In November 2012, the MSAR government withdrew same-sex cohabitants from the domestic violence legislation, leaving LGBT individuals unprotected under the proposed counter-domestic violence law.
Later, in December, Chao and some of his friends founded the Macau LGBT Rights Concern Group, which marks the beginning of LGBT rights movement in Macau. The group then organized the first Rainbow Equality Parade, dedicated to fighting for LGBT rights, including the protection under domestic violence legislation.

Coming out
In January 2013, the Macau LGBT Rights Concern Group conducted a survey over LGBT individuals’ situation in Macau. On the day the results being published, Chao announced publicly his sex orientation towards males.

Recent activities
 In February 2013, Chao believed that the fact that the government banned same-sex cohabitants from being in the domestic violence legislation might violate the International Covenant on Civil and Political Right since LGBT group should not be discriminated. Therefore, he sent a letter to United Nations Human Rights Committee, hoping that UN could intervene in this scenario.
 In April 2013, Macau Rainbow was established; the Macau LGBT Rights Concern Group became an affiliated organization in which Chao is the spokesperson.
 On the International Day against Homophobia, 2013, Chao, representing Macau Rainbow, held a flash mob at the Ruins of St. Pauls.

Notes

External links
Jason Chao's website Access Granted
Jason Chao Facebook account
website of New Macau Association
YouTube channel of New Macau Association
website of Macau Concealer
Youtube channel of Macau Concealer

1986 births
Living people
Macau people
Chinese LGBT rights activists